Golden Gates is an EP by American heavy metal/glam metal band Diamond Rexx. It was released by Red Light Records in 1989.

Track listing
 "Cold and Sorry" - 3:07
 "Crazy from Love" - 2:29
 "Golden Gates" - 3:48
 "Put Em on Ice" - 4:13
 "Lady in My Pocket" - 4:01
 "Cat House" - 2:46

Personnel

The band
Nasti Habits – Vocals
S. Scott Priest – Guitar
Chrissy Salem – Bass
Billy J Nychay – Drums, Percussion
 All Guitar played by John Luckhaupt (Johnny L Angel)

Production
 Mark Nawara – Producer
 Gary Loizzo – Engineer
 John Luckhaupt – Engineer, recording
 Jim Haupert & Mike Slawin - Photographers

References

Diamond Rexx albums
1989 EPs